Peter Frampton (born 1950) is an English singer-songwriter.

Peter Frampton may also refer to:
Peter Frampton (album), a 1994 album by the singer
Peter Frampton (make-up artist), Academy Award winning make-up artist of Braveheart

See also
Frampton (disambiguation)